The 2014 United States Senate election in Michigan was held on November 4, 2014, to elect a member of the United States Senate to represent the State of Michigan, concurrently with the election of the governor of Michigan, as well as other elections to the United States Senate in other states and elections to the United States House of Representatives and various state and local elections.

Incumbent Democratic Senator Carl Levin decided to retire instead of running for re-election to a seventh term. Primary contests took place on August 5, 2014, with U.S. Representative Gary Peters and former Michigan Secretary of State Terri Lynn Land unopposed on the Democratic and Republican primary ballots, respectively. Peters defeated Land in the general election, becoming the only freshman Democratic senator in the 114th Congress. This was the first open seat election in Michigan since 1994 and the first on this seat since 1918.

Democratic primary

Candidates

Declared 
 Gary Peters, U.S. Representative

Failed to qualify 
 Terry Whitney, technology executive

Declined 
 Shane Battier, National Basketball Association player
 Jocelyn Benson, Dean of Wayne State University Law School and nominee for Michigan Secretary of State in 2010
 Virgil Bernero, Mayor of Lansing and nominee for Governor in 2010
 Mark Bernstein, attorney and Regent of the University of Michigan
 James Blanchard, former governor of Michigan
 Debbie Dingell, chairman of the Wayne State University board of governors and wife of U.S. Representative John Dingell (running for MI-12)
 Jennifer Granholm, former governor of Michigan
 Dan Kildee, U.S. Representative
 Carl Levin, incumbent U.S. Senator
 Sander Levin, U.S. Representative and Carl Levin's brother
 Gretchen Whitmer, Minority Leader of the Michigan Senate

Endorsements

Polling

Results

Republican primary 
After Terri Lynn Land declared her candidacy in June 2013, Republicans attempted to recruit U.S. Representative Dave Camp and Oakland County District Court Judge Kimberly Small to run instead. Camp, after earlier having said that he was not interested in running, reconsidered it, and Land indicated that she would consider dropping out if Camp decided to run. Republicans were initially reluctant to rally around Land, but after Camp and Small declined to run, other Republicans like U.S. Representative Justin Amash and Holland Mayor Kurt Dykstra also said no, and a late attempt to convince cardiologist Rob Steele to run failed, Land emerged as the de facto nominee.

Candidates

Declared 
 Terri Lynn Land, former member of the Republican National Committee and former Michigan Secretary of State

Withdrew 
 Matthew Wiedenhoeft, businessman and former minor league hockey player and coach (running for the state house)

Declined 
 Justin Amash, U.S. Representative
 Saul Anuzis, former chairman of the Michigan Republican Party
 Dave Brandon, University of Michigan Athletic Director
 Brian Calley, Lieutenant Governor of Michigan
 Dave Camp, U.S. Representative
 Mike Cox, former Michigan Attorney General
 Betsy DeVos, former chairman of the Michigan Republican Party
 Dick DeVos, businessman and nominee for Governor in 2006
 Clark Durant, Charter School Advocate and candidate for the U.S. Senate in 1990 and 2012
 Kurt Dykstra, Mayor of Holland
 John Engler, former governor of Michigan
 Pete Hoekstra, former U.S. Representative and 2012 Senate nominee
 Ruth Johnson, Michigan Secretary of State
 Roger Kahn, state senator
 Pete Lund, Majority Whip of the Michigan House of Representatives
 Candice Miller, U.S. Representative
 Jim Murray, president of AT&T Michigan
 Andrea Fischer Newman, Regent of the University of Michigan
 John Rakolta, businessman
 Randy Richardville, Majority Leader of the Michigan Senate
 Mike Rogers, U.S. Representative
 Scott Romney, former member of the Michigan State University board of trustees, candidate for Attorney General of Michigan in 1998 and member of the Romney family
 Ronna Romney McDaniel, Republican National Committeewoman and member of the Romney family an candidate in 1994
 Bill Schuette, Michigan Attorney General
 Kimberly Small, judge on Michigan's 48th District Court
 Rob Steele, cardiologist

Endorsements

Polling

Results

Minor parties

Libertarian Party 
 Robert James "Jim" Fulner

U.S. Taxpayers Party 
 Richard A. Matkin

Green Party 
 Chris Wahmhoff

Independents

Candidates

Declared 
 Jeff Jones, retired financial services industry worker and pastor
 Paul Marineau, attorney and former mayor pro tem of Douglas

General election

Campaign 
Early on, the open seat was considered to be competitive. But various missteps by the Land campaign as well as Land's reluctance to appear in public after suffering a meltdown in front of the media in May weighed down the Land campaign, allowing Peters to open up a consistent lead in the polls beginning in September. The Republican establishment effectively gave up on Land's campaign the following month.

Debates 
Peters agreed to four debates; Land did not respond to invitations. Negotiations between the Land and Peters campaigns broke down over the format of proposed debates between the two candidates.

Predictions

Polling 

With Dingell

With Granholm

With Levin

With LOLGOP

With Peters

Results 
Peters was declared the winner right when the polls closed in Michigan.

By congressional district
Stabenow won 9 of 14 congressional districts.

Post-election 
Land would end up paying a fee of $66,000 to the Federal Election Commission for a violation of the Federal Election Campaign Act related to the 2014 campaign.

Peters would run again in 2020 to retain the Senate seat he won, while Land would go on to win a seat on the Board of Governors for Wayne State University in the same year.

See also 

 2014 Michigan gubernatorial election
 2014 Michigan Attorney General election
 2014 Michigan Secretary of State election
 2014 United States Senate elections
 2014 United States elections
 2014 United States House of Representatives elections in Michigan

References

External links 
 U.S. Senate elections in Michigan, 2014 at Ballotpedia
 Campaign contributions at OpenSecrets

Official campaign websites (Archived)
 Jim Fulner for U. S. Senate
 Jeff Jones for U.S. Senate
 Terri Lynn Land for U.S. Senate
 Paul Marineau for U.S. Senate
 Gary Peters for U.S. Senate
 Terry Whitney for U. S. Senate

2014
2014 Michigan elections
Michigan